Duane Alexander (August 11, 1940 – February 16, 2020) was an American medical doctor who was the director of the National Institute of Child Health and Human Development from 1986 through 2009. In 2009 he moved to the position of senior scientific advisor to the Director of the NIH's Fogarty International Center.

Alexander married Marianne Ellis in 1963. They have two children, Keith and Kristin.

He received his MD from Johns Hopkins.

On February 16, 2020, Alexander died after having battled Alzheimer's disease for several years.

References

External links 
 National Institutes of Health Profile

1940 births
2020 deaths
American pediatricians
National Institutes of Health people